The satin berrypecker (Melanocharis citreola), is a species of passerine bird belonging to the family Melanocharitidae. It is endemic to the montane cloud forests of Western New Guinea and was first identified in the Kumawa Mountains. It is only the second species to be described in New Guinea in the last 80 years and the first endemic species from the region known as the Bird's Neck. The satin berrypecker is the sixth species to be described in the genus Melanocharis.

Based on the elevation of its discovery and the colors of its plumage, it was originally believed to be a close relative to the mid-mountain berrypecker, however genome-wide analysis revealed that it is a closer relative to the phenotypically dissimilar streaked berrypecker.

References

satinberrypecker
Birds of New Guinea
satin berrypecker